The "Tricity Derby" is the name given to describe football matches between Arka Gdynia and Lechia Gdańsk, the two biggest teams in the Tricity area. The derby splits the Tricity area, with Arka representing Gdynia, the northern part of the Tricity, while Lechia represent Gdańsk which covers the southern part of the Tricity. 

The first meeting between the two clubs was in 1964, and has been contested a total of 41 times since then. Despite both teams having featured in the Ekstraklasa throughout their history, the first meeting between the two teams in the top flight happened in 2008. Lechia have been the most successful of the two teams, winning 17 of the contests compared to Arka's 11.

Club head-to-head

All-time results

League

Cup Competitions

Top goalscorers

Hat-tricks

Local impact

The Tricity derby has big impact on the local region with many teams fans having an allegiance with one of the two teams. 

Arka Gdynia has sympathisers from Wisła Tczew, Kaszubia Kościerzyna, Gryf Wejherowo, Orkan Rumia, MKS Władysławowo, Orlęta Reda, Stolem Gniewino,  Piast Człuchów and Zatoka Puck. The fans also have a friendship with fans of Gwardia Koszalin in the neighboring West Pomeranian Voivodeship.

Lechia Gdańsk has friendships and/or sympathisers  from Chojniczanka Chojnice, Bytovia Bytów, Gryf Słupsk, Pomezania Malbork, Czarni Pruszcz Gdański, KP Starogard Gdański, Unia Tczew, Wierzyca Pelplin and Olimpia Sztum.

References 

Football rivalries in Poland
Arka Gdynia
Lechia Gdańsk
Sport in Pomeranian Voivodeship